The following highways are numbered 269:

Canada
Manitoba Provincial Road 269
 Quebec Route 269

Japan
 Japan National Route 269

United States
 Interstate 269 
 Alabama State Route 269
 Arkansas Highway 269
 California State Route 269
 Florida State Road 269 (former)
 Georgia State Route 269 (former)
 Indiana State Road 269
 K-269 (Kansas highway) (former)
Kentucky Route 269
 Maryland Route 269 (former)
 Minnesota State Highway 269
 Missouri Route 269
 Montana Secondary Highway 269
 New York State Route 269
 Ohio State Route 269
 South Carolina Highway 269
 Tennessee State Route 269
 Texas State Highway 269 (former)
 Texas State Highway Spur 269 (former)
 Farm to Market Road 269 (Texas)
 Utah State Route 269
 Virginia State Route 269